The 1920 Croatian Peasant Rebellion also known as the Križ Republic was a revolt of Croatian peasants on 4–12 September 1920 in the countryside northwest and west of the city of Zagreb in the recently established Kingdom of Serbs, Croats and Slovenes. The rebellion, centered around the town of Križ, was the result of predominantly economic grievances and resistance to conscription in Croatia-Slavonia. The immediate cause of the revolt was a campaign to register and brand draft animals for military use by the Royal Serbian Army which was tasked with maintenance of public order in the area after the end of the World War I.

The first armed clashes took place in the area of Garešnica and Grubišno Polje and quickly spread to Križ. From there, the revolt spread northwest towards Zagreb, especially to the areas of Dugo Selo, Kloštar Ivanić, and Sveti Ivan Zelina. Another direction of the spread of the violence was to the towns of Popovača and Kutina to the southeast. Clashes were also reported in the areas of Bjelovar and Sisak. While the rebelling peasants disarmed local gendarmerie garrisons and took over municipal buildings in several towns and villages, reinforcements sent by the military fought and managed to restore government control over the area.

The events were detailed in a contemporary report by Ban of Croatia Matko Laginja which reported the economic grievances as the main cause of the revolt, but attributed at least some of the blame for the violence to the Croatian People's Peasant Party led by Stjepan Radić. There is no evidence that Radić, in prison at the time, or the party organised the rebellion, but its members supported, participated and, at least in some areas, led it. Filip Lakuš was a particularly vocal leader of the revolt in Križ. Association with the rebellion helped increase popularity of the Radić's party among Croats between the recently held local and the parliamentary elections in the Kingdom of Serbs, Croats and Slovenes held later that year. Thus the previously relatively minor party became the major Croatian political party of the interwar period.

Background
In the final year of the World War I, desertions from the Austro-Hungarian Army became widespread among recruits conscripted in the Kingdom of Croatia-Slavonia – one of lands comprising Austria-Hungary. The deserters, known as the Green Cadres, relied on banditry and voluntary support of peasants rejecting state authority as unjust. As specific acts of opposition to military and civilian authorities, the Green Cadres and the bulk of the peasantry particularly opposed military service and taxation.

Austria-Hungary was defeated and broke apart in 1918. After the dual monarchy's defeat, the South Slavic-inhabited lands of the former monarchy organised as the short-lived State of Slovenes, Croats and Serbs (SSCS) became a part of the newly established Kingdom of Serbs, Croats and Slovenes. The new country was formed as a union centering around the pre-war Kingdom of Serbia. The decision on the unification was expedited as the SSCS National Council was increasingly fearful of the unrest in the countryside, the Italian territorial claims set out in the Treaty of London and allegations that a pro-Habsburg coup was plotted by the General of the Infantry Anton Lipošćak. As the military units raised in the former Austro-Hungarian lands were being disbanded as unreliable in the aftermath of the Lipošćak affair, the Royal Serbian Army was invited by the National Council to the former Austro-Hungarian lands. There, it was tasked with protection of public order. In this task, the army was replaced by the newly established armed gendarmerie in early 1919. 

Political opponents of the establishment of the new state in Croatia-Slavonia included the Croatian People's Peasant Party (HPSS) – relatively minor party before the war that rose in prominence in part due to its advocation of pacifism and (eventually) republicanism. The rise of the HPSS's popularity coincided with an increase of violence in Croatia-Slavonia's countryside in the winter of 1918–1919, and the brutally suppressed 1918 protest in Zagreb. After the party-launched petition in support of a "neutral Croatian peasant state" received more than 115 thousand signatures in six weeks, rallies in its support were banned and its leader Stjepan Radić was arrested in March 1919 and kept in prison for almost a year. The authorities accused the HPSS of undermining the state authority and supporting outlaws. In the process, the authorities did not distinguish between the HPSS's anti-militarism and Bolshevism associated with the soldiers returning from Russian captivity in 1919 and mutinies taking place in Maribor, Varaždin, and Osijek. The HPSS sought to appeal to the peasants as its leaders equated the Kingdom of Serbs, Croats and Slovenes with Austria-Hungary by pointing out that both were only interested in levying taxes and conscripting peasants. By 1919, population of the Croatian hinterland perceived the Serbian military as an occupying force. This perception was built in a large part on resistance to conscription of soldiers sent to fight Albanians in the context of the Yugoslav colonization of Kosovo, arbitrary beatings by army and gendarmerie as extrajudicial punishment. Desertion became sufficiently common to cause a limited revival of the Green Cadres.

Timeline

Branding campaign
In late August 1920, the army started a campaign to brand privately-owned draft animals with the aim of designating animals fit for military use and potential drafting, and supply of horses and wagons for military training. The campaign provided the direct cause for renewed violence in the countryside east of Zagreb, but the unrest still had roots in economic issues. While draft animal registration was a process familiar to Croatian peasants since the time of Austria-Hungary, branding was a novelty. There were concerns that the animals would be physically harmed or that those branded as unfit for military service would lose their market value. The authorities ignored the concerns, thus allowing misinformation and rumours about motivation for the campaign to spread.

Preparations for revolt against the branding campaign started were carrried out in late August with participation of the HPSS members. Local authorities in the area south of Zagreb first became aware of intentions to disrupt the branding campaign by August 27, and leaflets calling on resistance, promising aid of the Green Cadres appeared by the end of the month. There were rumours that the "Serbs will come and take all the animals to Serbia", or France, and that animals are branded with letters "K" and "A" to indicate that they would be handed over to the Karađorđevićs and regent Alexander respectively. In some instances, army officers tasked with the branding campaign contributed to spreading of the rumours. In one recorded example, an army major threatened peasants in Ivanovo Selo questioning army motives with deportation to Albania and destruction of their village.

On 2 September, a crowd of peasants from surrounding villages gathered in Veliki Grđevac in the district of Grubišno Polje (about  East of Zagreb). Speakers urged the assembled peasants not to turn in their horses. In response, a Bjelovar-Križevci County clerk and the county secretary arrived, protected by gendarmes, to calm the crowd. This was repeated the next day. On 3 September, armed crowd of peasants tried to interfere with the work of the officials tasked with the branding of horses in nearby Garešnica and, according to a contemporary report prepared by Ban of Croatia Matko Laginja, two peasants were killed in the incident. The authorities ended the branding campaign on Laginja's urging on 4 September.

Clashes in Čazma and Križ

On 4 September, the crowd gathered once again in Veliki Grđevac. Unlike on the previous two days, they assaulted the 15 gendarmes accompanying the arriving county officials. According to the Laginja report, a peasant was killed and several wounded in the clash before the gendarmes led by Captain Janko Milčić scattered and ran away. Further clashes in vicinity of Bjelovar took place the same day in village of Rača where a municipal government building was seized and records torched, and in Ivanska where two peasants were killed when in a crowd of 300 that clashed with gendarmes. On the same day, peasants took control of the town of Čazma about  East of Zagreb. According to Laginja, crowd of about 400 confronted nine gendarmes in the town forcing them to flee and hide before the peasants proceeded to take weapons found in the district and municipal buildings. In response, the army deployed a company with a machine gun from Zagreb the following day. The reinforcements managed to restore government control of Čazma after an armed clash resulting in fatalities on September 8.

The rebels took away arms found there, cut down telegraph and telephone poles and captured the railway station in nearby village of Novoselec. On the following two days, the rebels took all firearms that could be found in Križ, broke into municipal government buildings, torched pictures of king Peter I and regent Alexander found in offices. A train taking army reinforcements from Zagreb to Kutina was stopped in Novoselec station on 7 September and a skirmish between the rebels and the soldiers resulted in fatalities on both sides. The train was commandeered by the peasants with the aim of using it to help spread the uprising to nearby towns. Peasant guards were set up to patrol key areas, while "people's courts" were set up and staffed by local HPSS members. Further clashes took place in villages of Severin and Velika Pisanica near Bjelovar on 5 September. The same day, the army and the gendarmerie deployed reinforcements to the West and North of Bjelovar, in villages of Farkaševac and Trojstvo to intercept rumoured assistance coming from across the nearby Hungarian border. The rebellion, ended by 9 September in the Križ area is also referred to as the Križ Republic.

Clashes in Dugo Selo and Sveti Ivan Zelina
On 6 September, unrest spread towards Zagreb. Shots were exchanged with a group of gendarmes in Dugo Selo resulting in fatalities on both sides. The peasants kept control of Dugo Selo for several hours before the authorities restored control of the town. On 7 September, gendarmerie station was attacked and captured in the town of Kloštar Ivanić located halfway between Dugo Selo and Križ. Two financial guards (customs officials) were killed in the fighting and the municipal notary assaulted. The army retook the town two days later on 9 September.

Another group of peasants fought three gendarmes in the village of Psarjevo near the town of Sveti Ivan Zelina (about  North of Dugo Selo) the same day. In the morning of 7 September, peasant crowds moved to Sveti Ivan Zelina where shots were exchanged with local gendarmerie. Telephone and telegraph lines were cut in the area and local administration buildings looted prompting the army to dispatch reinforcements from Zagreb to Sesvete just outside of Zagreb by train before setting off towards Sveti Ivan Zelina on foot. The reinforcements reached the town only in the morning. In the meantime, municipal and district administration and courts, as well as private shops and taverns were looted in Sveti Ivan Zelina. While the skirmishes were taking place in Dugo Selo and Sveti Ivan Zelina, a crowd of 2000 looted and torched local administration offices in villages of Belovar and Moravče between Sesvete and Sveti Ivan Zelina. In nearby Kašina, a municipal administration building was looted, and municipal clerks assaulted.

The municipal administration buildings and gendarmerie station in the village were looted and records torched. Local gendarmes were disarmed before additional 20 gendarmes sent by car from Zagreb could reach the village and restore control. At least one peasant was killed in the fighting. Further reinforcements were sent from Zagreb to the towns of Donja Stubica and Zlatar. A local garrison of seven gendarmes and several armed citizens guarded Zlatar against peasant advances from the villages of Ladislavec and Mače until the reinforcements arrived in the morning.

Clashes in Popovača and Kutina
The report indicated the crowd might move on further southeast to nearby Kutina and asked for reinforcements from Zagreb. There they linked up with another 30 gendarmes previously deployed in the area from Slavonski Brod to provide security along the Zagreb–Slavonski Brod rail line. The combined force reached Kutina on 8 September in time to meet rebellious crowds moving into the city. There were several fatalities in the ensuing shooting, but the gendarmes kept control of the town.

Clashes also took place in the villages in immediate vicinity of Sisak where rumours were spread that peasants would come from all over Croatia to help an attack on Zagreb with the aim of rescuing Radić from prison. On 8 September gendarmerie stations and municipal administration buildings were seized and municipal clerks chased away in Gušće and Topolovac. In the evening of 9 September, the Sisak–Zagreb railway was damaged and telegraph poles cut in the area of the village of Sela. Workers sent to repair the railroad were shot at by the rebels. The force attacking the repairmen was reported to consist of 150 (up to 1000, depending on the source) armed with at least one machine gun. In response, the army deployed a company of 78 soldiers from Zagreb to pacify the area. After the reinforcements suffered first casualties, another infantry company and a battery of cannon were sent from Zagreb. The artillery was not used though. On 10 September, skirmishes took place in the nearby villages of Letovanić and Cerje and several peasants were killed in fighting there. Destruction of the railroad was motivated by rumours that imprisoned Radić would be transferred from Zagreb to Belgrade by train. An army unit deployed to Lekenik to guard the nearby railway junction were attacked on the following two days before the army regained Letovanić on 12 September.

Aftermath

The rebellion was ended by 10 September in all areas except in the areas around Sisak, especially near Letovanić where fighting ended two days later. The rebel peasants dispersed in the woods around Letovanić where they remained active at least until 14 September when rail service to Zagreb had to be suspended while the army intervened against the rebels once more. Official statistics indicate that fifteen peasants were killed, although the figure is likely underestimated. Ten others were listed as fatalities by the authorities: three soldiers, two gendarmes, three civil servants and two financial guards. There were large-scale arrests, taking of hostages, and plundering of rebellious villages by the army in the aftermath of the rebellion. Beatings of peasants also became commonplace, and there was at least one killing reported in Novoselci where an elderly man disobeyed or did not hear a soldier's order to squat.

Laginja submitted his report to the interior minister Milorad Drašković as a confidential document on 27 September and it remains the most detailed account of the events. In his report, Laginja pointed out general discontent as the cause of the rebellion, specifically newly regulated unfavourable rate of exchange of the Austro-Hungarian krone to dinar, recruitment of conscripts including World War I veterans, taking of families of army deserters hostage, and reneging on the promise to deregulate tobacco planting and liquor distilling. The report also noted that the rebels were encouraged and led by individual supporters of the HPSS. In his report, Laginja mentioned several HPSS members leading or speaking to the peasant insurgents. Those include a mention of Juraj Krnjević's speech in Ivanić-Grad (who will eventually become the leader of the party), but Laginja noted that he did not know what was the objective of the speech, except that he was told that Krnjević appealed for calm. As Laginja noted, two particularly active peasant leaders in the Križ area were HPSS members Filip Lakuš (who called on establishment of a republic with Radić as its head) and Stjepan Uroić. The HPSS clearly encouraged the revolt, but there is no specific information on participation of party leadership in planning or execution of the revolt, but the HPSS's messengers played a major role in spreading of information on the events, HPSS members prominent at a local level were arrested among the rebellious peasants, and the area encompassed by the rebellion is the area where the HPSS was most active at the time.

Since the authorities did not draw much distinction between the HPSS's rejection of centralised authority and Bolshevism, the government downplayed peasant girevances and generally blamed Bolshevik influence in the countryside. Even though Radić's nephew Pavle Radić claimed in 1924 that the party did not start the rebellsion, Lakuš and Uroić were backed by the HPSS in the aftermath of the rebellion as party candidates for offices. Only two months after the rebellion, the HPSS took part in the 1920 Kingdom of Serbs, Croats and Slovenes Constitutional Assembly election. The vote saw the HPSS replace the Party of Rights as the Croatian national cause as Radić and the HPSS achieved the best election result among Croatian parties. The HPSS achieved a significant improvement in its electoral results compared to the local elections held earlier in the same year. For example, in the region of Slavonia (not previously a traditional party stronghold), the HPSS won 6% of seats in municipal assemblies in the Virovitica County, 2% in the Požega County, and no seats in the Syrmia County. In the parliamentary elections held shortly after the rebellion, the HPSS won 56% of parliamentary mandates available for the Požega County, 38% of the mandates in the Virovitica County and 21% in the Syrmia County. The electoral success was the result of the HPSS having demonstrated that it identifies with the problems of peasants in a country that is predominantly rural, including identification of the HPSS with the peasant rebellion of 1920.

References

Sources

1920 in Croatia
1920s in politics
Peasant revolts
Politics of the Kingdom of Yugoslavia
Protests in Croatia
Rebellions in Croatia